Jamie Macdonald (born December 22, 1994) is a Canadian short track speed skater. and has been a member of the senior national team since 2015

Career

2013
Macdonald competed at the 2013 Winter Universiade in Trentino, Italy.

2015
Macdonald competed at the 2015 Winter Universiade in Granada, Spain, where she won a bronze medal as part of the 3,000 metres relay.

2016
As part of the 2015–16 ISU Short Track Speed Skating World Cup, Macdonald won her first ever World Cup medal, a silver in the 1000 m event in Dordrecht, Netherlands. Macdonald followed this up with a silver in the 500 m event in Calgary, Alberta as part of the 2016–17 ISU Short Track Speed Skating World Cup.

2017
Macdonald won a bronze medal in the 500 m event as part of the Dresden World Cup. Macdonald was named to Canada's 2018 Olympic team in August 2017. This will mark her Olympic debut.

References

External links

1994 births
Living people
Canadian female speed skaters
Canadian female short track speed skaters
Olympic short track speed skaters of Canada
Short track speed skaters at the 2018 Winter Olympics
Universiade medalists in short track speed skating
World Short Track Speed Skating Championships medalists
People from Kitimat
Universiade bronze medalists for Canada
Competitors at the 2015 Winter Universiade